Part of series of articles upon Archaeology of Kosovo

The metal period incorporates a long stretched timeline of over three millennia, commencing from approximately 3500 BC up to middle of the 4th century BC. During this time, which includes the Copper, Bronze, and Iron Age periods we see the sophistication of life among the inhabitants of ancient Kosovo. This periods are well substantiated with archaeological findings, ranging from settlements to necropolises of different types, predominantly tumuli. There are vast amounts of artifacts that have been collected and uncovered during the last century from these settlements and tombs, which prove the existence of civilization, and its continuation from prehistoric periods.

Settlements

Gadime e Epërme
The archaeological site of Gradishta is situated on top of a plateau of the eponymous hill, set on the western part of the Zhegoc Mountains. The fortress holds an extraordinary Geo-strategic position and it is a typical Copper Age and Iron Age mountainous settlement with fortified area characteristics. The fortress is situated on the eastern part of Gadime e Epërme village. The site was archaeologically investigated during the 1973–1974, which resulted with the documented remains of the Copper Age, respectively the Bubanj Sallkuca–Krivadol culture occupation. Also the fortress was reused during the Late Iron Age. Nevertheless, it is important to say that during the Eneolithic period, the fortress was reconstructed on several occasions and is very significant that discovered fragments of pottery decorated with the graffito technique and ornamented with the lacernation motifs, are most probably done by sharp tools. On the other hand, in the later phase of life continuation, during the later part of the Iron Age, several interesting fragments of imported Greek ware were discovered.

Hisar
The archaeological site, respectively the prehistoric settlement of Hisar, is situated on the southwestern part of town of Suhareka, set on a plateau dominating the wider flat terrain of the north side, situated between Suhareka in the north and Shiroka in the south, on the right side of the road from Suhareka to Prizren. The terrace is an elliptic flat area measuring in diameter 180 x 90 m and counting a total surface of approximately 1.1 ha, with the highest elevation recorded 422 m (above sea level). The first archaeological excavations were carried out in several seasons; 1961–1963, 1978 and again after two and half decades, the Archaeological Institute of Kosovo continued in two annual seasons in 2003–2004. The discovered archaeological material recorded at this site during the excavations, stretches from the Late Neolithic continuing until the Iron Age, which offers an overview for the study of the material culture of the autochthonous Dardanian population. Hisar presents a very important prehistoric civilization not only for Kosovo, but for the entire Balkans, too. The site is proof of a flourished town from the Copper Age. Of the eleven stratigraphic layers the earliest is from the late Neolithic Age, progressing as a settlement all the way until the layer called Hisar VI of the Late Antiquity (4th-6th centuries AD). According to this chronological scheme the earliest phase of habitation in Hisar must be connected with the Reshtan phase of the Adriatic Late Neolithic.

Gllareva
The archaeological site of Gllareva is situated at the central part of the Gllareva village, Klina Municipality, situated on the right side of the Prishtina-Peja road, stretched on the fields of Rigjeva. This archaeological site was identified accidentally in 1973. The archaeological excavations conducted here in the 80s, were focused in two locations, not far from each other. Both sites were recorded as necropolises with two different burial rites. One of the necropolises is typical for flat burials constructed with stone plates, whereas the bases were covered with gravel, and the other necropolis was typical with incarnation ritual, respectively the cremation burial. Nevertheless, the inhumation rite is predominant, where out of 48 graves in tumuli I and II, only 3 are cremations. In the chronological aspect, both sites were dated to the Late Bronze Age. Amid many excavated/researched burials, besides abundant archaeological material discovered there, which were documented and recorded as the grave goods, of which, the most particular were several bronze coated swords and daggers, typical for Mycenaean culture recorded at this location. This clearly indicates the exchange and consolidated contacts between the ancient centers of the Greek world, and informs us about the established communication links among the intertribal societies of the Balkan tribes.

Boka e Përçevës

The Boka e Përçevës tumulus necropolis is situated few kilometers up northwest from the Gllareva necropolis. This grouped tumulus burial is dated in Late Bronze and Early Iron Period, and is very characteristic for the huge number of the dispersed burial mounds within a wider complex area. In total, 19 burial mounds were detected where, among them, only seven were excavated and researched during the 1970s. Rich and abundant archaeological material in the form of grave goods were discovered here, whereas, tooled weapons, different decorations and diverse qualitative vessels and earth ware pots, all together clearly reflect the undisputed facts of the remains of an advanced indigenous Dardanian civilization.

Rogovë
The tumuli necropolis of Rogova, situated at the location known locally as the Fusha (Field), is set around 4 km southeast from the tumuli necropolis of Fshej, located on the right side of the Gjakova-Prizren road. This necropolis complex comprises 6 burial mounds, mainly in good condition and some of them where quite damaged. The site was investigated for the first time in 1966 and then again in several other occasions in 1973, 2005 and lately in 2011. All previous researches resulted with the same outcome confirming the traces of a group of the tumulus which is based on the discovered movable archeological material dating in the Middle Bronze Age (1800–1500 BC). Nevertheless, the site was reused also during the Early Iron Age, again as a necropolis. The researched burials contained very rich grave goods, which according to the researchers, were stored in the graves together with the buried persons. The grave goods were personal objects or belongings of the deceased, in most case, either, weapons, decorations, and other personal possessions of not ordinary persons.

Korishë
The Bronze Age site of Korisha, was investigated in 2006, research excavations carried out through trial trenches. The site is situated on the eastern slope of the horse-saddle shaped hill near the Korisha antique castle. The settlement measures an approximate area of 1 hectare, with the highest elevation point recording 728 meter, and the lowest 723 meters above the sea level. The settlement was a typical fortified site, protected by nature in one side, and traverses on the other sides. The archaeological test excavations carried out at this locality at two sections, resulted with the documentation of typical Bronze Age dwellings, confirming the life continuity during the early and middle Bronze Period. Among the discovered movable archaeological material, the most worth mentioning ones are; stone tooled utensils, fragments of various earthenware and other smaller findings, typical for this period.

Bërnicë e Poshtme

The researched Late Bronze and Early Iron Age site of the Bërnica e Poshtme, is situated around 5 kilometers north of Prishtina, stretched along the Prishtina-Podujeva (Besiana) road. This is a typical flat necropolis whereas the cremation urn burial was practiced. The ashes of the deceased were stored in urns and buried inside either individual or group graves in flatten areas, that in the archaeological literature is known as the 'urn-fields necropolis'. Based on the results of research discovered material from this burial complex, a particular method of grave construction was recorded. The stone tholoid plates were set in the shape of a semicircular grave base. The urn-field burials were investigated in the 1980s, after an accidental finding of an urn. Nevertheless, since the discovery of this flat necropolis, this archaeological culture was named the Bërnica e Poshtme/Donja Brnica Culture.

Ponoshec
The tumulus necropolis of Ponoshec is situated at the locality known by the locals as Arëza, stretched in several parcels in around 5-6ha area, close to the river flow of the Labenica creek. The tumulus necropolis is composed by a grouped burial mounds; five of them were identified so far. In general, the tumulus measure between 12 and 18 m in diameter and the maximum height of the burial mounds goes up to 1 meter of elevation. The rescue excavations carried out during the 2011 season resulted with abundant discoveries of the grave goods with typical characteristics of the Iron Age Illyrian tumulus. Nevertheless, the study of the movable material as recorded here, proved interesting outcome on the site chronology and material culture, confirming the occupancy continuity from Bronze and particularly during the Iron Age. Nevertheless, the burial mounds were effectively reshaped in the 12th-10th century BC, and then again reused during the 6th and 4th century BC, a time period known as the Dardanian Antiquity.

Gjinoc
The Gjinoc burial mound (Illyrian tumulus), is a unique case of tumuluses recorded in Kosovo. The overall diameter of the tumulus measures: 84 meters running toward east-west and 73 meters running toward north-south. The highest elevation of the tumulus measures almost 10 meters and tumulus was not yet scientifically researched. Nevertheless, based on the overall dimensions, the tumulus construction, height and setting, most probably the burial mound was constructed during the Late Iron Age of the Dardanian antiquity. Moreover, when taking into consideration the overall facts, it might be stated that the giant tumulus grave was constructed for a very important family with a high social status.

Bellaçec
The Bellaçec (Bardh i Madh) prehistoric fortress is situated on top of a low hill, a naturally protected terrain configuration from north, south and east, in one hand, and the traverse and ditch barriers from the western part, which made this fortified settlement an important stronghold for its time. Additionally, the Drenica River flows below the foot of the hill, whereas few meters up north, the Çiçavica Mountains encircle the surrounding landscape. The ancient fortress is in the trapezoidal shape, measuring 70x50 meters inside the fort, while, the exterior surrounding is characterized by rows of traverses composed of mixed earth and river stones. This extraordinary strategic geographical position of the fortress was ideal for the inhabitants to observe a wide zone of the Fushë Kosovo region. The excavations confirmed occupancy evidenced based on the discovered material, which were unearthed after more than 28 centuries. The earthenware finds are mainly decorated with caneluras and dots, typical for the Dardanian decoration style of the Dardanian antiquity, respectively the late Iron Age, this also confirming the local and regional pottery production. The archaeological excavations carried on this site, mainly in the form of trial trenches at this site conducted in several seasons since the end of the sixties of the past century to continue up to present year. In 2011, a geophysical survey conducted with the geomagnetic device, has recorded underground features of the fort's compounds, premises which will come under the light through future excavations. The site occupancy was active during the 8th up to the 5th century BC.

Fshej
The Fshej tumulus necropolis belongs to the Late Iron Period (7th – 6th centuries BC). During the archaeological excavations carried out here in 2011, five tumulus burials were archaeologically excavated and researched, which resulted with rich and abundant archaeological material, typical for determination of the chronology of the site, which clearly confirms the occupancy of the Dardanian population, respectively the time period of the unification of their ethoculture. The burial mound group is situated approximately 800m south, southwest from the Ura e Shenjtë stone bridge. The funerary rite practiced here, the inhumation or free burial of the deceased buried inside a burial constructed as a grave case built with river stone graves, illustrates one of the burial rites of the indigenous population. Besides, the inhumation ritual practiced by the Dardanians, the incarnation/cremation of the late person was widely used in Dardania.

Llashticë

The Llashtica burial mounds are situated approximately 10 km northeast from the Gjilan, set on the left bank of the Morava e Binçës River, stretched in a wider area of the agricultural fields of Llashtica village and bordering with the mountains of Karadak. Nine burial mounds were recorded so far, all characteristic for the Late Iron Age. Approximately, 1.5 km north from this site, a flat settlement was researched through scan excavations carried out in 2011, confirming the same occupancy period with the mounds, respectively the Late Iron Period. Nevertheless, the archaeological researches’ were carried out in several seasons at the Llashtica tumulus site commencing in 1980, 1981 and 1982, whereas, five burial mounds were excavated up to the geological layer. In 2011, a tumulus known as number VIII was excavated in two segments. On the other hand, as stated earlier above, the Iron Age settlement researched in 2011 offered an overview of the past society while the burial and settlement complemented the information of the indigenous population. In regard, wealthy archaeological movable objects discovered here, different in form and material as for example the earthenware, jars, plates and jewelry (fibulas, bracelets, necklaces, etc.) and on the other hand, fragmented cult figures with bird motifs coated on bronze, all clearly an overview of a vivid reflection of the Iron period civilization. One of the burial mounds (tumulus VIII), which is in a relatively good condition, measures in dimensions; 32 x 32m in diameter, whereas the height of the tumulus survived up to 1.60 meter. The archaeological excavations revealed remains of the deceased who was cremated and ashes most probably scattered. The tumulus necropolis is dated in the Late Iron Period.

Shiroka
Shiroka group burial mounds situated near the Shiroka village, situated around 1.5 km south of town of Suhareka (Theranda), stretches on the right side of the road. The Dardanian cultural group of the tumulus, characteristic for the construction type with circle shaped graves, built by a mixture of earth and river stones, was identified at this site in 1953 by I.Nikolic, a worker of the Kosovo Museum. The excavations happened because some villagers of Shiroka had discovered some archaeological articles while planting their grape vines. Not far from this locality, a multilayer site of Hisar in one side and the Dubiçak burial mounds in the other side are situated. The past archaeological excavations carried here, resulted with the remains of a necropolis of the Bronze Age date and reused during the Late Iron Age. The discovered movable archaeological material composed of abundant and particular findings distinctive for the ornamented and decorated earthenware, most likely indicate that the vessels were imported and came through the trade and exchange from the Hellenic world and beyond. The necropolis of Shiroka, was erected during the 8th–6th century BC. In 1963 excavations were continued by J.Todorovic, when he dug out two of the eight tumuli of the Shiroka Necropolis, dating from the same period—i.e., 8th-6th century BC.

The first tumulus had a diameter of 13m, height of 0.75m. It contained 5 graves with cremation, and in inventory of ceramic pottery and bronze ornaments.
The second tumulus had a diameter of 12 m, height of 0.75m. It contained 6 graves with cremation, and inventory of ceramic pottery and iron weapons. From the evidence it was concluded that they belong to the Dardanian/Illyrian tradition of tumuli.

Lubozhda
The village of Lubozhda is situated west from the town of Istog and the place is characteristic for the recorded archaeological site known by the toponymy Livadhi, set only few hundred meters on the left side of the road. Several burial mounds are stretched at this area, typical for the Iron Age, a period of the formation of the Illyrian ethnical and cultural identity, a population that has inhabited the entire Illyrian peninsula (the present Balkans) and beyond. The discovery of a very rich grave inventory within one of the tumulus graves, with a collection of jewelry (silver coated bracelets, etc.) clearly illustrates the fact that it did belong to a distinguished dignitary buried at this site. Nevertheless, the grave goods were dated to sometime between the 6th and 5th century BC. Only 7 km from this site an archaeological site of the Banja e Pejës of the same date is found. Also from the analogy of the composition of the archaeological material, the similarity is evident. Therefore, there must have been a link between both sites or they even belonged to the same entity. The geophysical prospection carried at this area during the 2011, identified several tumulus graves which are not visible from the visual observation of the terrain.

Banja e Pejës
Ancient archaeological site of Banja e Pejës, situated in the crossroad that links Peja with Istog, is only 12 km northwest from Peja. During the construction period of Onyx hotel in 1974, a typical Illyrian military helmet was discovered accidentally. Apropos, the archaeological rescue excavations commenced at this site that resulted with abundant movable archeological material being discovered, while among the most important ones uncovered features a grave of an important pair of people that was named by the archeologists as The Royal Tomb. The couple's grave was constructed in the rectangular shape base and built with tuff stone plates, most probably extracted from the neighboring quarry. The recorded female grave contained rich grave goods material for example; fibula, omega shape needles, a ring and necklace decorated with geometrical motifs, forged in silver and bronze. On the other hand, the male burial grave contained the grave goods, personal belongings composed of; weapons, silver and bronze jewelry. The archaeological documentation of these important and valuable findings, among others, offers a picture of the time, characteristic for the social and economical differentiation of individuals or groups. Rich archaeological material discovered at this site belongs to the Late Iron Age, 6th-5th century BC. Surrounding micro region is rich on site and off site findings of different periods, confirming the continuity and occupancy of these most probably due to the great life conditions when having in mind the thermal water sources near this site. On the other hand, the landscape and geostrategic favorable position were ideal for selection of this locality to be inhabited during the long time period.

Prizren

A distinctive chance finding of a very particular artifact, discovered somewhere in Prizren, sometime during the second part of the 19th century; presents a unique exhibit of a bronze cast statue with a figure of a female athlete on the run. This masterpiece is also known as the Prizren Maenad. The bronze statuette has a height of 11.4 cm and could’ve been a part of an ornament affixed in a decorative vessel. The statuette is dated between 520–500 BC, probably made during the Archaic Greek Period. Nowadays, this unique artefact belongs to the British Museum, respectively to the Greek & Roman Antiquities Collection, since it was sold in 1876, by an antiquarian trader called Seraphim, believed to be of Armenian origin. The bronze caste statuette is on the 'move' (run), with her body turned to the front, looking down to her right and holding up her skirt in her left hand. She wears a short skirt with fold falling from right shoulder and exposing her right breast, while her hair falls back in parallel waves behind. The Prizren runner (female athlete) is an artefact most likely imported from Greek Sparta.

Another different and rare finding which is almost special as the Prizren runner is the bronze statuette of a seated goat of the 6th century BC. According to the written sources, this figurine was discovered accidentally in 1939, somewhere in Jaglenica, suburban part of Prizren. The figurine measures a length of 6.5 cm and is about 3 cm wide and of 6.5 cm high, with the weight of only 380 grams. The bronze statuette of the sitting goat is exposed at Vranje Museum.

Dardana Fortress

A carved relief showing a funeral procession scene, that reflects a funeral of a man, whose coffin is followed by what appears to be his wife in front of the procession, was accidentally discovered at the Kamenica fort area, respectively at the southern part at the bottom of the fort's hill. Most probably, the engraved funerary scene is a creation modeled during the Classical Period (5th–4th century BC), however, it might be also a late work carried during the Hellenistic Period (4th–1st century BC). Nevertheless, the carved procession scene resembles to a mourning organized rite of mass mourning, practiced in organized group manner following the cortege with grief and sorrow, a ritual still practiced in the mountainous region of Malësia e Gjakovës, which on the other hand, can be treated as the spiritual heritage existing still nowadays. From other point of view, when carefully observing the female mourner's figures of this funerary ceremony, it is clear that they wear dresses that resemble with Illyrian xhubleta gown in the shape of campanile, which might be argued that there is likeness with the typical autochthones woman dress most probably used since the Bronze Age and still worn in the mountainous and distant rural parts inhabited by Albanians. The engraved (Fragmented) stelea is exhibited at the lapidarium of the Archaeological Park of the Kosovo Museum. As for the Illyrian dress, a typical local modern era xhubleta gown is exhibited at the exhibition room of the Ethnographical Museum 'Emin Gjiku' in Pristina.

See also 
 Museum of Kosovo
 Kingdom of Dardania
 Archaeology of Kosovo
 Neolithic sites in Kosovo
 Roman heritage in Kosovo

References

Bibliography
 Nicholas Marquez Grant, Linda Fibiger. "Kosovo" The Routledge Handbook of Archaeological Human Remains and Legislation, Taylor & Francis, 2011, 
 Milot Berisha. "Archaeological Guide of Kosovo", Kosovo Ministry of Culture, Youth and Sports and Archaeological Institute of Kosovo, Prishtine 2012, Print
 Luan Përzhita, Kemajl Luci, Gëzim Hoxha, Adem Bunguri, Fatmir Peja, Tomor Kastrati. "Harta Arkeologjike e Kosovës vëllimi 1/ Archaeological Map of Kosovo vol.1" Akademia e Shkencave dhe e Arteve e Kosovës, Prishtinë 2006, 
 Cultural Heritage Without Borders. "An Archaeological Map of the Historic Zone of Prizren", CHwB Kosovo office, Report Series No.2/2006.
 Gail Warrander, Verena Knaus. Kosovo 2nd ed. Bradt Travel Guides, 2011, 
 Besiana Xharra, Source: Balkan Insight, "Kosovo's Lost City Rises From Earthy Tomb", http://archaeologynewsnetwork.blogspot.com/2011/01/kosovos-lost-city-rises-from-earthy.html#.UR95dvI7owo
 Tom Derrick, "Ulpiana: Digging in Kosovo" source: https://web.archive.org/web/20130308102614/http://www.trinitysaintdavid.ac.uk/en/schoolofclassics/news/name%2C14937%2Cen.html
 Philip L. Kohl, Clare Fawcett, "Nationalism, Politics and the Practice of Archaeology", Cambridge University Press, 1995, 

Archaeological sites in Kosovo
Illyrian Kosovo